see also the Chillicothe Correctional Institution, Ohio

The Chillicothe Correctional Center is a state prison for women in Chillicothe, Livingston County, Missouri, owned and operated by the Missouri Department of Corrections. The $120 million facility opened in late 2008, and with a capacity of 1740 inmates at a mix of security levels.

The previous prison, in downtown Chillicothe at 1500 Third Street, had been established in 1888 as the Chillicothe Industrial Home for Girls.

During the COVID-19 pandemic, the prison reported 252 positive cases among inmates and 27 among staff.

Notable inmates 
 Pam Hupp - Convicted of murdering Louis Gumpenberger after entering an Alford Plea.

Gypsy Rose Blanchard - Pled guilty to 2nd degree murder and sentenced to 10 years in 2020 for the 2015 stabbing death of her mother, Dee Dee, who may have for years forced her to pretend she had serious health problems; subject of the HBO documentary Mommy Dead and Dearest and The Act.

Alyssa Bustamante - Pled guilty to 2nd degree murder and Armed Criminal Action of the murder of nine year old Elizabeth Olten in 2009. A few weeks later, she was sentenced to life imprisonment with the possibility of conditional release, and a consecutive sentence of 30 years.

References

External links 

 NRHP nomination form for old facility
 Amateur video tour of old facility

Prisons in Missouri
Buildings and structures in Livingston County, Missouri
Chillicothe, Missouri
2008 establishments in Missouri